The Flying Eleven is an Australian boat designed as a high performance racing skiff suitable for 12- to 18-year-olds. High performance sailing is fast becoming the goal of a great many dinghy sailors with the appearance of 49ers as an Olympic class.The Flying Eleven is a logical step in the transition between junior classes such as the Manly Junior or Sabot and prepares young sailors for classes such as Cherubs, 420s, 470s, 29ers, Moths, 13s or even 49ers.

History
The F11 started in 1964. The main classes available for training young sailors were the VJ, MJ, Moth, Heron and it appeared there was an opening for a class with:
Comparable speed to the VJ 
No hiking boards
More leg room
Main, jib and spinnaker 
Light weight for transporting 
A crew of two
Ease of building and 
The possibility of dad getting his foot in occasionally

The acceptance campaign then started and three different "models" of the Flying Eleven were taken to different clubs each weekend and sailed in all weathers. These three models were called the Open Sailer, the Self Drainer, and the Fully Decked Model. The fully decked model did not appeal to the go-fast boys and, although the self drainer was popular, the VJ self drainer was well established therefore the emphasis was put on a boat which, firstly, had to be expertly sailed to stay afloat and, secondly, would serve as a trainer for the open skiff classes — so the open sailer it had to be.

During the 1965–66 season Sans Souci Club accepted the F11 as a class, other clubs slowly followed and the NSW Fll Association was formed in 1967. After trying various types of additional buoyancy, such as side tanks, the lines were redrawn and a complete set of plans issued to the Association, covering hull, sails, centreboard and rudder.

The early F11s were not as attractive or sophisticated as today - the clew of the genoa was 16" above the gunwale — the mainsail hung from one full length top batten, with some short leech battens, all battens were made of cane, and the venturis, which were tube and box type with corks, would today be regarded as museum pieces.

Since then, there have been many updates to the Flying 11 to ensure that it remains attractive to young sailors. For example, most Flying 11s are now made of fibreglass foam sandwich, rather than wood. The most recent of these updates is the allowance for carbon-fibre masts and carbon-fibre foils in the class specifications.

Competition

Typical National Championships have around 100 boats competing. Since 2005, these have been held in NSW, Tas and QLD. 
 2005: Sydney Harbour 95 boats
 2006: Belmont 16' Skiff Sailing Club 72 boats
 2007: Nedlands Yacht Club in Perth 43 boats
 2008: Manly 74 boats
 2009: Eden 53 boats
 2010: Tamar YC, Tasmania 70 boats
 2011: Belmont 103 boats
 2012: Port Stephen 87 boats
 2013: St George SC, Sydney 81 boats
 2014: Port Stephen 83 boats
 2015: Royal Queensland Yacht Squadron 67 boats
 2016: Belmont 68 boats
2017 Royal Yacht Club of Tasmania 44 boats

Typical NSW State Titles also have around 100 boats

High-profile sailors to come from the class: 
 In recent years: Olivia Price (Olympic Silver), Natasha Bryant (1st 29er Youth Worlds), Byron White(2nd 29er Youth Worlds), Andrew Chapman(18fters, sailmaker), Josh McKnight(Moth World winner), Jacqui Bonnitcha, Joe Turner, James Dorron (Dual 16 ft Skiff National Champion), John Winning, Kylie Mara, Nathan Outteridge(Olympic Gold), Iain Jensen, Nicky Souter(Women's Match World, Gold)
 Over the years: Adam Beashel, Craig Ferris, James Spithill, Jonathan Bonnitcha, Malcolm Page(Olympic Gold, twice), Michael Coxon(sailmaker), Nathan Wilmot, Stephen McConaghy(boat builder) .

References

External links
 Flying Eleven Association of Australia
 Flying 11 Association Constitution and Class Measurements

Dinghies